Estonia participated in the Eurovision Song Contest 2022 in Turin, Italy, with "Hope" performed by Stefan. The Estonian broadcaster  (ERR) organised the national final  2022 in order to select the Estonian entry for the contest.

The national final consisted of seven shows: four quarter-finals, two semi-finals and a final. Ten songs competed in each quarter-final and semi-final and five qualified from each show as determined by a jury panel and public vote. In the final, the winner was selected over two rounds of voting, the first involving both a jury and the public, and the second and ultimate entirely decided by the public.

Estonia was drawn to compete in the second semi-final of the Eurovision Song Contest which took place on 12 May 2022. Performing during the show in position 12, "Hope" was announced among the top 10 entries of the second semi-final and hence qualified to compete in the final. In the final, Estonia placed 13th with 141 points. It was later revealed that the country placed 5th in the semi-final with 209 points.

Background 

Prior to the 2022 contest, Estonia had participated in the Eurovision Song Contest twenty-six times since its first entry in 1994, winning the contest on one occasion in 2001 with the song "Everybody" performed by Tanel Padar, Dave Benton and 2XL. Following the introduction of semi-finals for the 2004, Estonia has, to this point, managed to qualify to the final on seven occasions. In , "The Lucky One" performed by Uku Suviste failed to qualify Estonia to the final where the song placed thirteenth in the semi-final.

The Estonian national broadcaster,  (ERR), broadcasts the event within Estonia and organises the selection process for the nation's entry. ERR confirmed Estonia's participation at the 2022 Eurovision Song Contest on 27 August 2021. Since their debut, the Estonian broadcaster has organised national finals that feature a competition among multiple artists and songs in order to select Estonia's entry for the Eurovision Song Contest. The  competition has been organised since 2009 in order to select Estonia's entry and on 28 August 2021, ERR announced the organisation of  2022 in order to select the nation's 2022 entry.

Before Eurovision

Eesti Laul 2022 
 2022 was the fourteenth edition of the Estonian national selection , which selected Estonia's entry for the Eurovision Song Contest 2022. The competition consisted of forty entries competing in four quarter-finals and two semi-finals, leading to a ten-song final on 12 February 2022. All shows were broadcast live on ETV, on ETV+ with Russian commentary as well as streamed online at the broadcaster's official website err.ee. The final was also broadcast in Spain on Ten as well as via radio in Estonia on Raadio 2 with commentary by Kristo Rajasaare, Margus Kamlat, Erik Morna and Robin Juhkental.

Format 
The format of the competition included four quarter-finals on 20 November, 27 November, 4 December and 11 December 2021, two semi-finals on 3 and 5 February 2022 and a final on 12 February 2022. Ten songs competed in each quarter-final and five from each quarter-final qualified to the semi-finals. Ten songs competed in each semi-final and the top five from each semi-final qualified to complete the ten song lineup in the final. The results of the quarter-finals were determined solely by public televoting for the first three qualifiers and votes from a professional jury for the fourth and fifth qualifiers, while the results of the semi-finals were determined by the 50/50 combination of jury and public voting for the first qualifiers and a second round of public televoting for the remaining qualifiers. The winning song in the final was selected over two rounds of voting: the first round results selected the top three songs via the 50/50 combination of jury and public voting, while the second round (superfinal) determined the winner solely by public televoting.

Competing entries 

On 2 September 2021, ERR opened the submission period for artists and composers to submit their entries up until 20 October 2021 through an online upload platform. Each artist and songwriter was able to submit a maximum of five entries. Foreign collaborations were allowed as long as one of the songwriters were Estonian and that there were a maximum of two foreign songwriters, one being the composer and one being the lyricist. A fee was also imposed on songs being submitted to the competition, with €50 for songs in the Estonian language and €100 for songs in other languages. 202 submissions were received by the deadline, of which 84 were in Estonian with the remaining in English, French, Spanish, Italian and an imaginary language. A 17-member jury panel consisting of Andi Raig, Bert Järvet, Eda-Ines Etti, Eric Kammiste, Heili Klandorf, Henri Laumets, Hugo Martin Maasikas, Jürgen Pärnsalu, Kadiah, Kaspar Viilup, Leonardo Romanello, Liis Lemsalu, Meelis Meri, Tarmo Hõbe and  selected 40 quarter-finalists from the submissions and ten of the selected songs were announced each week on the ETV entertainment program , between 15 November 2021 and 7 December 2021.

Shows

Quarter-finals
Four quarter-finals took place on 20 November, 27 November, 4 December and 11 December 2021 at the ERR studios, hosted by previous Estonian Eurovision Song Contest entrants Tanel Padar and Eda-Ines Etti (first quarter-final), Uku Suviste and Tanja Mihhailova-Saar (second quarter-final), Ott Lepland and Laura Põldvere (third quarter-final), and Getter Jaani and Jüri Pootsmann (fourth quarter-final). In each quarter-final ten songs, revealed five days prior to each show, competed for the first three spots in the semi-finals with the outcome decided upon by a public televote. The remaining two qualifiers were decided by a jury panel between the remaining non-qualifiers. The public vote across the four quarter-finals registered an average of 8,000 votes.

Semi-finals
Two semi-finals took place on 3 February 2022 at the Saku Suurhall in Tallinn, hosted by Priit Loog and previous Estonian Eurovision Song Contest entrant Maarja-Liis Ilus. In each semi-final ten songs competed for the first four spots in the final with the outcome decided upon by the combination of the votes from a jury panel and a public televote, with the fifth qualifier decided by an additional televote between the remaining non-qualifiers. The jury panel that voted in the semi-finals consisted of Alar Kotkas, Rolf Roosalu, Tanja Mihhailova-Saar, Kadri Tali, Margus Kamlat, Mari-Liis Männik, Elina Born, Mihkel Mattisen and Maris Järva. The public vote in the first semi-final registered 18,716 votes in the first round and 6,205 votes in the second round, while the public vote in the second semi-final registered 18,195 votes in the first round and 6,066 votes in the second round.

Final
The final took place on 12 February 2022 at the Saku Suurhall in Tallinn, hosted by Priit Loog and previous Estonian Eurovision Song Contest entrant Maarja-Liis Ilus. The five entries that qualified from each of the two preceding semi-finals, all together ten songs, competed during the show. The winner was selected over two rounds of voting. In the first round, an international jury (50%) and public televote (50%) determined the top three entries to proceed to the superfinal. The public vote in the first round registered 69,514 votes. In the superfinal, "Hope" performed by Stefan was selected as the winner entirely by a public televote. The public televote in the superfinal registered 57,197 votes.

In addition to the performances of the competing entries, the show was opened by Uku Suviste, who represented Estonia in the Eurovision Song Contest 2021, while Eurovision Song Contest 2002 hosts Annely Peebo and Marko Matvere as well as Jüri Pootsmann, who represented Estonia in the Eurovision Song Contest 2016, performed as the interval acts.

Ratings

At Eurovision 
According to Eurovision rules, all nations with the exceptions of the host country and the "Big Five" (France, Germany, Italy, Spain and the United Kingdom) are required to qualify from one of two semi-finals in order to compete for the final; the top ten countries from each semi-final progress to the final. The European Broadcasting Union (EBU) split up the competing countries into six different pots based on voting patterns from previous contests, with countries with favourable voting histories put into the same pot. On 25 January 2022, an allocation draw was held which placed each country into one of the two semi-finals, as well as which half of the show they would perform in. Estonia has been placed into the second semi-final, to be held on 12 May 2022, and has been scheduled to perform in the second half of the show.

Once all the competing songs for the 2022 contest had been released, the running order for the semi-finals was decided by the shows' producers rather than through another draw, so that similar songs were not placed next to each other.

Voting

Points awarded to Estonia

Points awarded by Estonia

Detailed voting results
The following members comprised the Estonian jury:
 Karl Killing
 Liina Ariadne Pedanik
 Maian Anna Kärmas
 Sven Lõhmus
 Toomas Olljun

Notes

References

External links
 

2022
Countries in the Eurovision Song Contest 2022
Eurovision